Won't Look Back is the eighth studio album by Swedish singer Pandora, released in Finland in February 2002 and Internationally in February 2003. The album peaked at number 40 on the Finnish Charts, becoming Pandora's fourth top forty album in Finland, and first since This Could Be Heaven in 1998.

Track listing 
 "I Won't Look Back" – 3:43
 "Don't Worry" – 3:41
 "I Found Love" – 4:06
 "Every Second Beat" (featuring Eric Martin)  – 3:28
 "Come a Little Closer" – 4:27
 "When I'm Over You" – 3:40
 "Crazy Way About You" – 3:45
 "I Need to Know" – 3:37
 "Nature of Love" – 3:48
 "Believe in Me" – 3:48
 "Anyway" – 3:48
 "I'm the Better Woman" – 3:09

NB: "Don't Worry", "I Found Love", "Every Second Beat", "Come a Little Closer", "I Need to Know", "Believe in Me" and "Anyway" were on Pandora's previous studio album, A Little Closer.

Charts

Release history

References 

2002 albums
Pandora (singer) albums